Stephan Svante Walter Kullberg (born 10 January 1959) is a former Swedish footballer (defender). He played for Åtvidabergs FF, IFK Göteborg, Djurgårdens IF, IF Brommapojkarna and Gimonäs CK.

References

Swedish footballers
Åtvidabergs FF players
IFK Göteborg players
Djurgårdens IF Fotboll players
1959 births
Living people
Association football defenders